The Jamaican euphonia (Euphonia jamaica) is a species of bird in the family Fringillidae.
It is endemic to Jamaica.
Its natural habitats are subtropical or tropical moist lowland forest and heavily degraded former forest.

References

Jamaican euphonia
Endemic birds of Jamaica
Jamaican euphonia
Jamaican euphonia
Taxonomy articles created by Polbot